Festival Melbourne2006 was a twelve-day cultural event which ran concurrently with the 2006 Commonwealth Games in the Australian city of Melbourne.

References

External links
 Official website of Festival Melbourne2006

2006 Commonwealth Games
Festivals in Melbourne